Younès Rachidi (born 13 September 1986) is a Moroccan former tennis player.

Rachidi has a career high ATP singles ranking of 753 achieved on 14 October 2013. He also has a career high ATP doubles ranking of 473 achieved also on 18 November 2013. In 2023, Rachidi was banned for life from professional tennis and fined $34,000 after being found guilty of committing 135 match fixing offences by the International Tennis Integrity Agency.

Career
Rachidi made his ATP main draw debut in the doubles event of the 2012 Grand Prix Hassan II. At the 2015 Grand Prix Hassan II, Rachidi reached the semifinals of the doubles event partnering Lamine Ouahab.

Playing for Morocco in Davis Cup, Rachidi has a W/L record of 5–4.

References

External links
 
 
 

1986 births
Living people
Moroccan male tennis players
Match fixing in tennis
Match fixers